Wine Dark Sea is the debut studio album by English-Australian musician Jon English. The album was released in Australia in March 1973.

Track listing
Vinyl/ cassette (2907 006)
Side one
 "Summer Long" (G. Wayne Thomas) - 4:36
 "Sweet Lady Mary" (Ronnie Lane, Rod Stewart, Ronnie Wood) - 5:23 
 "Wine Dark Sea"	(Jon English) - 3:29
 "Horsehair and Plastic" (Jon English) - 2:39	
 "Close Every Door" (Andrew Lloyd-Webber, Tim Rice) - 2:46
 "Monopoly" (Thomas) - 3:54
Side two	
 "Handbags and Gladrags" (Mike d'Abo)  - 5:54
 "Prelude / Tomorrow"	(Thomas/ English) - 4:19
 "Brand New Day" (Al Kooper) - 5:28
 "Share the End" (Carly Simon) - 4:58

Weekly charts

References

External links

1973 debut albums
Jon English albums